Daniel López may refer to:

 Daniel Lopez (athlete) (born 1968), American Olympic athlete
 Daniel López (cyclist) (born 1994), Spanish racing cyclist
 Daniel López (footballer, born 1969), retired Chilean footballer
 Daniel López (footballer, born 1992), Spanish footballer
 Daniel López (footballer, born 2000), Mexican footballer for Club Tijuana
 Daniel López (water polo) (born 1980), Spanish water polo goalkeeper
 Daniel López Ramos (born 1976), retired Spanish footballer
 Dani López (footballer, born 1983), Spanish footballer for Iraklis Thessaloniki F.C.
 Dani López (footballer, born 1985), Spanish footballer for Inverness Caledonian Thistle
 Daniel Alejandro López (born 1989), tennis player from Paraguay
 Daniel Lee Lopez (1987–2015), American convicted of murder of police officer Lt. Stuart Alexander. Executed by lethal injection in Texas
 One of the fake identities used by the dictator Augusto Pinochet